The Americas Zone is one of the three zones of regional Davis Cup competition in 2013.

In the Americas Zone there are three different groups in which teams compete against each other to advance to the next group.

Participating nations

Seeds:
 
 

Remaining Nations:

Draw

 relegated to Group II in 2014.
 and  advance to World Group Play-off.

First round

Uruguay vs. Dominican Republic

Second round

Ecuador vs. Chile

Colombia vs. Uruguay

Second round play-off

Chile vs. Dominican Republic

References

External links
Official Website

Americas Zone I
Davis Cup Americas Zone

it:Coppa Davis 2013 Zona Asia/Oceania Gruppo I
zh:2013年台維斯盃亞洲及大洋洲區第一級